The 2013 Leeward Islands Junior Championships in Athletics took place on June 1, 2013.  The event was held at the A. O. Shirley Recreation Ground in Road Town, Tortola, British Virgin Islands.  Detailed reports were published.

A total of 28 events were contested, 15 by boys and 13 by girls.

Results
The Leeward Islands Junior Championships were held jointly with the BVI Twilight Invitational and the event was covered on Facebook.  Complete results for both competitions can be found on the British Virgin Islands Athletics Association webpage.

BVI Twilight Invitational
The results of the BVI Twilight Invitational were discussed in detail.

Leeward Islands Junior Championships (Open)

Boys

Girls

Medal table (Leeward Islands Junior Championships, unofficial)

Participation

BVI Twiligth Invitational
According to an unofficial count, 42 athletes from 13 countries participated.

 (1)
 (4)
 (5)
 (6)
 (6)
 (1)
 (8)
 (1)
 (4)
 (2)
 (1)
 (1)
 (2)

Leeward Islands Junior Championships (Open)
According to an unofficial count, 89 athletes from 8 countries participated.

 (10)
 (36)
 (1)
/ (6)
 (2)
 (7)
 (12)
 (15)

References

2013
Leeward Islands Junior Championships in Athletics
Leeward Islands Junior Championships in Athletics
2013 in youth sport